Johannes Sebastian Polgar (born 25 August 1977) is a German sailor, who specialized in the multihull (Tornado) and keelboat Star) classes. Together with his partner Florian Spalteholz, he was named one of the country's top sailors in the mixed multihull catamaran for the 2008 Summer Olympics, finishing in eighth place. After the Games, Polgar decided to move into the Star class and eventually shared a gold-medal victory with his partner Markus Koy at the 2010 Europeans in Viareggio, Italy. A member of North German Regatta Club, Polgar trained most of his competitive sailing career under the tutelage of his Norwegian-born personal coach Rigo de Nijs.

Polgar competed for the German sailing squad, as a 30-year-old skipper in the Tornado class, at the 2008 Summer Olympics in Beijing. Leading up to their maiden Games, he and crew member Spalteholz topped the selection criteria in a duel against brothers Tino and Niko Mittelmeier for the country's Tornado berth, based on their cumulative scores attained at two international regattas stipulated by the German Sailing Federation. The German duo started off the race series in the middle of the fleet until the shifty wind conditions propelled them to the front on the final half with a single victory and a triad of top-five marks, making both Polgar and Spalteholz eligible for the medal race. An unforeseen capsize by the German duo on the initial run, however, saw their medal chances vanish, plummeting them further to eighth overall with 74 net points.

References

External links
 
 
 

1977 births
Living people
German male sailors (sport)
Olympic sailors of Germany
Sailors at the 2008 Summer Olympics – Tornado
Sportspeople from Arnsberg (region)
People from Olpe, Germany